

Gallery

See also

 Transport in Nicaragua
 List of airports in Nicaragua

References

External links
OpenStreetMap - Costa Esmeralda Airport
Costa Airport Esmeralda Website 
Million  Aeropuerto de US$13 millones operará desde noviembre Nicaraguahoy 8/5/2015

Airports in Nicaragua
Río San Juan Department